Marta Estela DuBois (December 15, 1952 – May 8, 2018) was a Panamanian-American actress. DuBois had a steady career on episodes of numerous television series and films. She may be best known as the female lead—homicide detective Roberta Hansen—in the McBride franchise of 10 television films.

Early years
DuBois was born in David, Chiriquí, Panama.

Career

DuBois co-starred in the single season of the television series Tales of the Gold Monkey,  which ran from September 1982 through June 1983. DuBois had a recurring role on Magnum, P.I. and made guest appearances on series such as Hardcastle and McCormick, Vega$, The A-Team, L.A. Law, Silk Stalkings, Martin (TV series), Matlock, 
Walker, Texas Ranger and Star Trek: The Next Generation.

She made her film debut with a supporting role in the 1979 drama Boulevard Nights. She followed this with roles in the films Dead Badge (1995), and Black Out (1996). DuBois played actress Rita Gam, close friend and bridesmaid of the future Princess Grace of Monaco, in the 1983 television film Grace Kelly, and appeared in the television movie The Trial of the Incredible Hulk (1989).

In 2000, DuBois co-starred in the romantic comedy Luminarias. Between 2005 and 2008, DuBois played Sergeant Roberta Hansen in ten McBride television movies.

She portrayed Dora in the television western Lone Rider (2008) and had a guest role as Maria Cordero in the Law & Order: Los Angeles episode "Ballona Creek" (2010).

Death
On May 8, 2018, DuBois died of a brain aneurysm in Los Angeles, California, at age 65.

Filmography

Film

Television

References

External links
 

1952 births
2018 deaths
Panamanian actresses
People from David District
Deaths from intracranial aneurysm